This is the list of tourist attractions in Perak, Malaysia.

Galleries
 Sultan Azlan Shah Gallery

Historical buildings
 Birch Memorial Clock Tower
 Dutch Fort
 Ipoh Railway Station
 Kellie's Castle
 Ngah Ibrahim's Fort

Memorials
 Al-Ghufran Royal Mausoleum
 Taiping War Cemetery

Museums
 Beruas Museum
 Darul Ridzuan Museum
 Geological Museum
 Palong Tin Museum
 Perak Museum
 Perak Royal Museum
 Sitiawan Settlement Museum

Nature
 Gaharu Tea Valley
 Maxwell Hill
 Tempurung Cave
 Pangkor Island
 Taiping Lake Gardens

Religious places

Buddhist temples
 Sasanarakkha Buddhist Sanctuary
 Sukhavana Meditation Monastery

Chinese temples
 Sam Poh Tong Temple (三寶洞)
 Kek Look Seah Temple (極樂社)

Church
 All Saints' Church
 Wesley Methodist Church

Hindu temple
 Arulmigu Maha Muthu Mariamman Thevasthanam

Mosque
 Sultan Idris Shah II Mosque
 Ubudiah Mosque

Sport centres
 Azlan Shah Stadium
 DBI Sports Complex
 Perak Stadium
 Proton City Stadium
 Velodrome Rakyat

Shopping centres
 Markets of Taiping
 Mallridzuan (upcoming)

Theme parks
 Lost World of Tambun
 MAPS Perak

Towers
 Leaning Tower of Teluk Intan

Transportation
 Iskandariah Bridge
 Sultan Abdul Jalil Shah Bridge
 Temenggor Lake Bridge
 Victoria Bridge

Zoo
 Zoo Taiping

See also
 List of tourist attractions in Malaysia

References

 
Tourism in Malaysia
Perak